This is a list of New Mexico State Aggies football players in the NFL Draft.

Key

Selections

References

New Mexico State

New Mexico State Aggies NFL draft